The International Blue Cross is a politically and denominationally independent Christian organization consisting of about 40 member organizations engaged in the prevention, treatment and after care of problems related to alcohol and other drugs.

It was founded in 1877 in Geneva by L-L. Rochat.

See also
Modrý kríž (Blue cross in Slovak)

References

External links

Temperance organizations
Organizations established in 1877
Organisations based in Geneva
Alcohol in Switzerland
1877 establishments in Switzerland